Holdin' the Bag is a country studio album by American rock and roll band Supersuckers. It was released on October 16, 2015, by Acetate Records.

Track listing
 "Holdin' the Bag" – 4:00
 "This Life (Would Be a Whole Lot Better If I Didn't Have to Share It) With You" – 3:11
 "High & Outside" – 3:25
 "Man on a Mission" – 3:06
 "I Can't Cry" – 2:46
 "Let's Bounce" – 2:41
 "I Do What I Can (To Get By)" – 3:06
 "Jibber Jabber" – 2:27
 "That's How It Gets Done" – 3:13
 "Shimmy & Shake" – 2:10
 "All My Rowdy Friends (Have Settled Down)" – 4:04
 "Georgia on a Fast Train" – 2:23

References

Supersuckers albums
2015 albums